The Citadel of Herat (Pashto: سکندرۍ کلا ; Dari: ارگ هرات) also known as the Citadel of Alexander, and locally known as Qala Iktyaruddin (Pashto ; Dari: قلعه اختیارالدین), is located in the center of Herat in Afghanistan. It dates back to 330 BC, when Alexander the Great and his army arrived to what is now Afghanistan after the Battle of Gaugamela. Many empires have used it as a headquarters in the last 2,000 years, and was destroyed and rebuilt many times over the centuries.

From decades of wars and neglect, the citadel began to crumble but in recent years several international organizations decided to completely rebuild it. The National Museum of Herat is also housed inside the citadel, while the Afghan Ministry of Information and Culture is the caretaker of the whole premises.

Recent restoration

The citadel of Herat was completely renovated between 2006 and 2011. The latest restoration involved hundreds of Afghan craftsmen and funds from the Aga Khan Trust for Culture and about $2.4 million from the U.S. and German governments.
About 1,100 items from the Herat region are stored inside the museum at the citadel and many have been on display.

At a ceremony in October 2011, U.S. Ambassador Ryan Crocker stated that: "Until 35 years ago, tourists from around the world came here to experience heritage, history and incomparable national landscapes... We look forward to the day when Afghans and visitors from around the world will once again come here to learn about Afghanistan's rich history and enjoy the great hospitality and beauty that this land and its people have to offer." Also present on the occasion was Afghan-expert Nancy Dupree and this is what she had to say: "I've been here many times, but it was crumbling... This is impressive.... I think the most exciting thing is to see something finally accomplished. I have seen so many half-finished things."

Gallery

References

External links

Citadel
Forts in Afghanistan
Royal residences in Afghanistan
Palaces in Afghanistan